Ellen Demming (born  Betty Ellen Weber; November 10, 1922  – February 7, 2002) was an American actress, best known for her role as Meta Bauer on the soap opera Guiding Light, which she played from 1953 to 1974.

Life 
A Schenectady, New York-born graduate of Stephens College, Demming also acted in off-Broadway and summer stock theatrical productions. She played Mary in Family Portrait. Brooks Atkinson deemed her performance, as the Virgin Mary, as full of "...pride, modesty, and great delicacy of feeling." After her retirement from The Guiding Light, she moved to South Salem, New York, and later, to Vermont.

Personal life
She was married to television producer Hal Thompson. She died in 2002, aged 79, in Springfield, Vermont, from undisclosed causes.

References

1922 births
2002 deaths
Actresses from New York (state)
American soap opera actresses
American stage actresses
Stephens College alumni
Actors from Schenectady, New York
People from South Salem, New York
20th-century American actresses